Sevak Khanagyan (born 28 July 1987) is a Russian-Armenian singer and songwriter. Khanagyan came to prominence while competing in season four of The Voice of Russia in 2015, and he later won season seven of X-Factor Ukraine the following year. He has been a coach on The Voice of Armenia since its fourth season in 2017. Khanagyan represented Armenia in the Eurovision Song Contest 2018 with the song "Qami" (Wind).

Early life
Khanagyan was born on 28 July 1987 in Metsavan, a village in the Lori Province. When he was in seventh grade, his family left Armenia and moved to Kursk in Russia. He went on to study music in Moscow, and graduated with a degree in 2014.

Career

2015–2017: Beginnings and X-Factor Ukraine
In 2015, Khanagyan competed in the first season of Glavnaya Stsena, the Russian version of The X Factor. He was mentored by Maxim Fadeev, but was eliminated in the quarter-finals. Later that year he began participating in season four of The Voice of Russia. He joined the team of Polina Gagarina but was eliminated in the knockout rounds. The following year, Khanagyan left Russia to compete in season seven of X-Factor Ukraine. Throughout the show, he was mentored by Anton Savlepov and went on to win the competition. Following his success on X-Factor Ukraine, Khanagyan returned to his home country Armenia and became a coach on the third season of The Voice of Armenia.

2018–present: Eurovision Song Contest

In December 2017, he was confirmed as a competitor in Depi Evratesil 2018 with the song "Qami". In March, 2018 Public TV of Armenia released the official Music Video of Sevak's "Qami". Director of the music video is Arthur Manukyan. Sevak qualified from the second semi-final on 21 February 2018, and went on to win the competition on 25 February. He went on to represent Armenia in the Eurovision Song Contest 2018, but failed to qualify from the first semi-final coming in 15th place with 79 points.

Discography

Albums

Singles

References

External links
 Sevak Khanagyan's biography

1987 births
Eurovision Song Contest entrants for Armenia
21st-century Armenian male singers
Armenian pop singers
Armenian songwriters
Eurovision Song Contest entrants of 2018
Living people
Musicians from Kursk
Writers from Kursk
People from Lori Province
Russian people of Armenian descent
Russian pop singers
Russian male singer-songwriters
The Voice (franchise) contestants
The X Factor winners
21st-century Russian male singers
21st-century Russian singers